Paul McCloy (born 6 November 1963) is a Canadian long-distance runner. He competed in the men's 10,000 metres at the 1988 Summer Olympics. McCloy won a bronze medal at the 1987 Pan American Games in the 10,000 metres. His Canadian record for the men's 10k road race (28:17), set in Orlando Florida on 21 February 1987 held for over 35 years until June 26, 2022 when Ben Flanagan from Kitchener, Ont., ran 28 minutes 11 seconds (28:11) at the BAA 10K competition in Boston.

References

External links
 

1963 births
Living people
Athletes (track and field) at the 1988 Summer Olympics
Canadian male long-distance runners
Olympic track and field athletes of Canada
Athletes (track and field) at the 1987 Pan American Games
Pan American Games bronze medalists for Canada
Pan American Games medalists in athletics (track and field)
Athletes (track and field) at the 1986 Commonwealth Games
Athletes (track and field) at the 1990 Commonwealth Games
Athletes (track and field) at the 1994 Commonwealth Games
Commonwealth Games competitors for Canada
Sportspeople from St. John's, Newfoundland and Labrador
Medalists at the 1987 Pan American Games